Simons is a surname.

Notable people

A 
 Alan Simons (born 1968), Welsh goalkeeper
 Alexandra Simons de Ridder (born 1963), German equestrian
 Algie Martin Simons (1870–1950), American socialist journalist, newspaper editor and political activist
 Andra Simons, Bermudian writer
 Ann Simons (born 1980), Belgian judoka
 Arthur D. Simons (1918–1979), U.S. Army Special Forces officer

B 
 Barbara Simons (born 1941), American computer scientist
 Benjamin Simons, British theoretical physicist
 Billy Simons (born 1983), American singer

C 
 Carlos Simons (born 1954), Turks and Caicos Islands lawyer
 Charles Simons (footballer) (1906–1979), Belgian footballer
 Charles Casper Simons (1876–1964), American judge
 Charles Earl Simons, Jr. (1916–1999), American judge
 Charles-Mathias Simons (1802–1874), Luxembourg politician
 Claude Simons, Jr. (1914–1975), American college sports coach
 Claude Simons, Sr. (1887–1943), American college sports coach

D 
 Daniel Simons (born 1969), American psychologist and cognitive scientist
 Dave Simons (1954–2009), American comic book artist
 David G. Simons (1922–2010), American physician and Airforce pilot
 Dot Simons (1912–1996), New Zealand sportswoman, sports journalist and writer
 Doug Simons (born 1966), American baseball pitcher

E
 Ed Simons (conductor) (1917–2018), American violinist and conductor
 Elwyn L. Simons (1930–2016), American paleontologist
 Eric Simons (born 1962), South African cricketer
 Eva Simons (born 1984), Dutch singer-songwriter

F 
F. Estelle R. Simons (born 1945), Canadian scientist

G 
 Geoff Simons (1939–2011), British freelance writer

H 
 Heintje Simons (born 1955), Dutch singer and actor
 Hellmuth Simons (1893–1969), German bacteriologist
 Henry Calvert Simons (1899–1948), American economist
 Howard Simons (1929–1989), American journalist
 Hywel Simons (born 1970), Welsh actor

J 
 Jack Simons (1882–1948), Australian businessman and politician
 James Harris Simons (born 1938), American mathematician and hedge fund-manager
 Jan Simons (1925–2006), Canadian baritone
 Jennifer Simons (born 1953), Surinamese politician
 Jesse Simons (1917–2006), American labor arbitrator
 Jim Simons (golfer) (1950–2005), American professional golfer
 Joe Simons (born 1947), Dutch ice hockey player
 Joseph H. Simons (1897–1983), American chemist
 Johan Simons (born 1946), Dutch theatre director
 John Simons, British radio executive
 John Simons (chemist) (born 1934), British physical chemist
 Jonathan Simons (born 1958), American physician and oncologist
 Jozef Simons (1888–1948), Flemish writer and poet
 Jud Simons (1904–1943), Dutch gymnast

K 
Keneth Alden Simons (1913–2004), American electrical engineer
 Kip Simons, American gymnast

L 
Lao Genevra Simons (1870-1949), American mathematician and writer

M 
 Margaret Simons (born 1960), Australian journalist and writer
 Marlise Simons, Dutch journalist for the New York Times
 Marylin Simons, (born 1959), Surinamese writer
 Matt Simons, American singer-songwriter and musician
 May Wood Simons (1876–1948), American writer, teacher and socialist
 Mel Simons (1900–1974), American baseball player
 Menno Simons (1496–1561), Dutch Anabaptist
 Moisés Simons (1889–1945), Cuban composer

N 
 Nancy Simons (born 1938), American swimmer
 Nicholas Simons, Canadian politician
 Netty Simons (1913–1994), American pianist, music editor, music educator and composer
 Nina Simons (born 1957), American businesswoman

P 
 Paul E. Simons, American diplomat
 Paullina Simons (born 1953), Russian author
 Perla Simons (born 1963), Honduran politician
 Peter Simons (academic) (born 1950), British philosopher
 Peter Simons (businessman) (born 1964), Canadian businessman

R 
 Rachel Simons (1914–2004), South African communist and trade unionist
 Raf Simons (born 1968), Belgian fashion designer
 Regillio Simons (born 1973), Dutch footballer
 Renee Simons (born 1972), Canadian curler
 Richard D. Simons (born 1927), New York state judge
 Rita Simons (born 1977),  English actress, singer and model
 Robert Simons (1922–2011), English cricketer
 Robert Simons American economist
 Ronald C. Simons (born 1935), American psychiatrist and anthropologist
 Ronald L. Simons (born 1946), American criminologist and sociologist
 Rosearik Rikki Simons (born 1970), American voice actor and writer

S 
 Samuel Simons (1792–1847), American politician from Connecticut
 Seymour Simons (1896–1949), American pianist, composer, orchestra leader, and radio producer
 Shirley Simons (1897–1963), American architect
 Simeon Simons (1759–1853), Native American bodyguard of George Washington
 Simone Simons (born 1985), Dutch mezzo-soprano
 Sylvana Simons (born 1971), Dutch television presenter and politician

T 
Thomas Simons (born 2004), British Youtuber and Twitch streamer (known online as TommyInnit)
 Timmy Simons (born 1976), Belgian footballer

W 
 Walter Simons (1861–1937), German lawyer and politician
 William Simons (1940–2019), Welsh actor

X 
 Xavi Simons (born 2003), Dutch footballer

See also
 La Maison Simons
 Fitzsimmons
 Simmonds
 Simmons (surname), Simmons (disambiguation)
 Simon (surname), Simon (disambiguation)
 Simonds (disambiguation)
 Simone (disambiguation)
 Symonds
 Symons

References

Dutch-language surnames
English-language surnames
Patronymic surnames
Surnames from given names